Ndunda is a minor Mambiloid language of Nigeria. It was discovered by Roger Blench near the Mvanip-speaking town of Zongo Ajiya. Ndunda village is situated about 5 kilometers from Yerimaru, to the south of Zongo Ajiya. It is closely related to but distinct from Mvanip.

References

Mambiloid languages
Languages of Nigeria